Korean Genome Project (KGP) is the largest Korean Genome Project which currently includes over 10,000 human genomes sequenced in Korea by April 2021. KGP was originated from the national initiative of sequencing the reference Korean and whole population genomes in 2006 by KOBIC, KRIBB and NCSRD, KRISS, Daejeon in Korea. From 2009, KGP was supported by the Genome Research Foundation and TheragenEtex to build the Variome of Koreans as well as the Korean Reference Genome (KOREF). Starting from KOREF, a consensus variome reference, providing information on millions of variants from 40 additional ethnically homogeneous genomes from the Korean Personal Genome Project was completed in 2017. Updating the technology an improved version of KOREF was then constructed using long-read sequencing data produced by Oxford Nanopore PromethION and PacBio technologies has been released showcasing newer assembly technologies and techniques. In 2022 a new chromosome-level haploid assembly of KOREF was published, assembled using Oxford Nanopore Technologies PromethION, Pacific Biosciences HiFi-CCS, and Hi-C technology.

Since 2014, KGP has been supported by Ulsan National Institute of Science and Technology, Clinomics, and Ulsan City, Ulsan, Korea. KGP released 1,094 Korean whole genome sequences (the Korea1K or KGP 1000 project) on 27 May 2020 in Science Advances. Having a stable, high-quality reference, KOREF has been used to benchmark sequencing technologies such as MGI DNBSEQ-T7 and Illumina HiSeq2000, HiSeq2500, HiSeq4000, HiSeqX10, and NovaSeq6000 sequencing technologies. The variome data has already been a useful reference to study the origin and composition of Korean ethnicity when compared to ancient DNA sequences. 

KGP consortium

The final Goal of KGP aims to sequence ~85,000,000 Koreans. I.e, every ethnic Korean on Earth.

References

External links
KoreanGenome.org
Opengenome.net
www.srd.re.kr
1000genomes.kr

Genome projects